Peterman's Station is a historic locale, site of a ranch and stage station located along the Gila River.  It was first established by a man named Peterman, in 1857 along the route of the San Antonio-San Diego Mail Line, later a station of its successor, the Butterfield Overland Mail, 19 miles east of Fillibuster Camp, 12 miles west of Griswell's Station.

Isaiah C. Woods, operating manager of the San Antonio–San Diego Mail while establishing the route, described Peterman's Station on his return from San Diego on November 9, 1857:

By the time of the Civil War Petermans was called Mohawk Station in Union Army reports.

References

Ghost towns in Arizona
San Antonio–San Diego Mail Line
Butterfield Overland Mail in New Mexico Territory
American frontier
History of Arizona
Former populated places in Yuma County, Arizona
Stagecoach stations in Arizona
1857 establishments in New Mexico Territory
Locale (geographic)